Mohammad Hossein Kanaanizadegan (born 23 March 1994) is an Iranian footballer player who currently plays for Al Ahli SC (Doha) and Iranian national football team as a defender.

Club career

Persepolis
He joined Persepolis in January 2012. He signed a two and a half years contract until the end of 2013–14 season with the club. He made his debut for Persepolis as a starter against Foolad in final fixture of 2011–12 Iran Pro League. He played for Persepolis U21 in AFC Vision Asia U21 Tehran Premier League.

Loan to Beira Mar
Kanaani joined Portuguese club Beira Mar on loan in August 2013. But due to work permit issues he returned to Iran without playing a single match.

Loan to Malavan
He joined Malavan on a two–year loan to spend his conscription period in summer 2014. Kanaani scored his first goal for Malavan in a 1–1 draw against Esteghlal.

Esteghlal
In May 2016, after completing his two–year conscription period at Malavan, it was thought Kanaani would return to his original club Persepolis. However, Kanaani rejected Persepolis' offer and joined their rivals Esteghlal. Shortly after joining the club, Kanaani suffered a season-ending injury after only playing two games. He was released by Esteghlal at the end of the season having only played two games for the club.

Saipa 
He played 2017–18 season for Saipa FC.

Machine Sazi 
He joined Machine Sazi for 2018–19 season. He finished the 2018–19 Persian Gulf Pro League at Machine Sazi F.C. with 27 appearances and 1 goal.

Persepolis 

On 7 July 2019, Kanaanizadegan signed a two-year contract with Persian Gulf Pro League champions Persepolis. Kanaanizadegan scored his first goal for Persepolis in a 1–0 victory over Sanat Naft Abadan on 16 September 2019.

International career

U17

He played two matches at the 2010 Asian U16 Championships.

U20
He started in all four games for the 2012 Asian U19 Championship Qualifiers helping the team keep a clean sheet in all of them. He started in Iran's first game during the Championships helping Team Meli keep a clean sheet and even hitting the bar from 30 meters out. He was part of Iran U–20 during 2012 AFC U-19 Championship qualification, 2012 CIS Cup, 2012 AFF U-19 Youth Championship and 2012 AFC U-19 Championship.

U23
He invited to Iran U-23 training camp by Nelo Vingada to preparation for Incheon 2014 and 2016 AFC U-22 Championship (Summer Olympic qualification). He named in Iran U23 final list for Incheon 2014.

Senior
Kanaanizadegan made his debut against Uzbekistan in a friendly match on 11 June 2015. He also played against Turkmenistan on 16 June 2015. He scored his first goal for the team with the 3rd goal in the 14-0 thrashing of Cambodia in the 2022 World Cup Qualifiers on 10 October 2019. He scored his second goal for the team with a header against Syria on 30 March 2021.

Career statistics

Club

International
Scores and results list Iran's goal tally first.

Under-20

Honours
Persepolis
Persian Gulf Pro League (2): 2019–20, 2020–21
Hazfi Cup: Runner-up 2012–13
Iranian Super Cup (1): 2020
AFC Champions League runner-up: 2020

References

External links

 Hossein Kanaani  at PersianLeague 

https://www.the-afc.com/competitions/afc-champions-league/teams/605/1969/424889 

Hossein kanaani

1994 births
Living people
Iranian footballers
Persepolis F.C. players
Malavan players
Esteghlal F.C. players
Sportspeople from Khuzestan province
Iran under-20 international footballers
Association football defenders
Footballers at the 2014 Asian Games
2019 AFC Asian Cup players
Asian Games competitors for Iran
Iran international footballers
2022 FIFA World Cup players